The Dominion of Canada Rifle Association (DCRA) is a Canadian shooting sports organization. It was founded in 1868 and incorporated by an Act of Parliament 63-64 Victoria Chapter 99, assented to July 7, 1900, to promote and encourage the training of marksmanship throughout Canada.

History
On April 1st 1868, General MacDougall called a meeting in Ottawa, where it was decided to form the Dominion of Canada Rifle Association, bringing together thirty three disparate associations.

The first Annual Prize Meeting was held just outside Montreal. In excess of 900 competitors turned up to compete for $5,500 in prize money (equivalent to nearly $200,000 in 2022). The DCRA has continued to hold prize meetings every year since, except during the two World Wars. The Rideau Range near Ottawa served as the national range until 1897. In 1898 the Meeting moved to Rockcliffe, which permitted shooting from 200 to 1000 yards with room for extension back to 2000.

The DCRA erected a plaque in 1906 at St. Andrew's Presbyterian Church in Ottawa which is dedicated to Lt Colonel John MacPherson (1830-1906), who served as its treasurer for 36 years.

In 1921, the Association moved again to Connaught Ranges, which they were granted the use of in perpetuity.

The DCRA erected a memorial plaque at the DCRA building at the Connaught Ranges (Shirley's Bay) which is dedicated in memory of the members of the DCRA who gave their lives in World War II.

Macdonald Stewart Pavilion

In 1896 the DCRA ran a competition for the construction of a pavilion on Bisley Camp, England. This was to serve as a residence for the Canadian national team when competing at the National Rifle Association's annual Imperial Meeting. The contract was awarded to the firm of C J Saxe and R M Rodden of Montreal, who completed "the Macdonald Stewart Pavilion" in 1897 (more often known at Bisley as "Canada House"). Aside from providing a comfortable accommodation for the team, the specification called for extensive use of Canadian woods and show off the versatility of the materials to all visitors. In 2003 the building became Grade-II listed by Historic England and has since been used as a filming location for Netflix series The Crown, as a stand-in for period locations in North America.

Provincial Rifle Associations

The provincial rifle associations are:

 Alberta Rifle Association
 British Columbia Rifle Association
 Manitoba Provincial Rifle Association
 Nova Scotia Rifle Association
 Ontario Rifle Association
 Prince Edward Island Rifle Association
 Province of Quebec Rifle Association
 Royal New Brunswick Rifle Association
 Saskatchewan Rifle Association
 National Capital Region Rifle Association

See also
Canada
Canadian Firearms Program
Canadian Firearms Registry
Gun politics in Canada
Possession and Acquisition Licence

International
 : National Rifle Association of America
 : National Rifle Association of Australia
 : National Rifle Association of New Zealand
 : National Rifle Association

References

External links
Official homepage
Official homepage for affiliated match results
DCRA Rifle

1868 establishments in Ontario
Rifle associations
Sports governing bodies in Canada
Regions of the International Confederation of Fullbore Rifle Associations
Gun politics in Canada